Probitas Partners is an independent, global advisory firm founded in 2001. The company is focused on raising capital as a placement agent for private equity fund sponsors as well as providing portfolio management and liquidity solutions, through the private equity secondary market, for investors in private equity. The firm operates through three primary businesses: fund placement, portfolio management and secondary advisory. In 2002, the firm established a European placement business.

Probitas Partners identifies and raises capital for some alternative fund managers across multiple strategies. Among the notable private equity firms that Probitas has represented in fundraising are: Alta Partners, CIVC Partners, Granite Ventures, KRG Capital, Littlejohn & Co., MidOcean Partners, and Panorama Capital.

In 2015, Probitas Partners announced the promotion of four new managing directors who will continue managing the growth of the firm. It was reported that "these promotions are in recognition of contributions to the success of the firm and in anticipation of continued success on behalf of our fund sponsor and institutional investor clients".

References

Seconda anyone? Infrastructure Investor, May, 2009
Probitas patents 'counterparty' liquidity product .  Private Equity Online, March 16, 2009
Probitas patents 'counterparty' liquidity product Private Equity Real Estate, March, 2009
In A World Of Reduced Appetites, Distressed Debt and Secondary Funds Come To The Fore.  PE Hub, January 20, 2009
The Private Equity Secondaries Market, A complete guide to its structure, operation and performance The Private Equity Secondaries Market] PEI Media, 2008
Small portions, Forbes Magazine April 2008
A Second(ary) Chance for Venture Capital.  BusinessWeek.com, 2009
DiNapoli’s Ban: A Placement Agent Responds.  WSJ.com April 22, 2009
For real this time – transactions in the real estate secondary market set to grow The Institutional Real Estate Letter, June 2008
Former UBS Executive Joins Probitas Partners  New York Times Deal Book, April 9, 2007
Bank of America to list fund of funds on Euronext exchange May, 2007
Will Placement Agents Push Themselves right Out of a Job?.  Reuters Buyouts, December 12, 2005

Private equity secondary market
Financial services companies established in 2001
Investment banks in the United States
Companies based in San Francisco
Financial services companies based in California